Osino is a census-designated place (CDP) in along the Humboldt River in central Elko County, Nevada, United States. As of the 2018 United States Census American Community Survey it had a population of 661.

Demographics

Description
Osino is located on Interstate 80 (Exit 310) on the northern foothills of two mountain ranges: the Elko Hills (on the south) and the Adobe Range (on the west).

See also
 List of census-designated places in Nevada

References

External links

Census-designated places in Elko County, Nevada
Census-designated places in Nevada